Seventh Dream of Teenage Heaven is the debut studio album by English rock band Love and Rockets. It was released on 11 October 1985, through record label Beggars Banquet. Seventh Dream was preceded by the non-album single "Ball of Confusion" on 17 May 1985, and the album's first proper single "If There's a Heaven Above" on 13 September 1985.

The album was remastered in October 1999 and reissued in the year 2000 with six bonus tracks (four B-sides and two alternate mixes) and new album cover artwork.

Reception 

AllMusic wrote, "Though the years have deadened its impact somewhat, there is still a visceral thrill to be drawn from replaying the first Love and Rockets album, a sense of the first step taken towards a brave new world", calling the album "as profound an experience as any of the lauded trips of the original psychedelic era."

Track listing

Personnel 

 Love and Rockets

 Daniel Ash – vocals, guitar, keyboards, production, sleeve design
 David J – vocals, bass guitar, keyboards, electric guitar on "Saudade", production, sleeve design
 Kevin Haskins – drums and keyboards, production, sleeve design

 Additional personnel

 John A. Rivers – keyboards, string arrangement on "Saudade", engineering, production

 Technical

 Mitch Jenkins – back cover photography

References

External links 

 

1985 debut albums
Love and Rockets (band) albums
Beggars Banquet Records albums
Neo-psychedelia albums